The 1913 Holy Cross football team was an American football team that represented the College of the Holy Cross in the 1913 college football season.

In its first and only year under head coach Harry Von Kersberg, the team compiled a 3–6 record. Wilfred Metivier was the team captain.

The season began with a tragedy, as Vernon S. Belyea, a junior halfback at Norwich University, was paralyzed while running back a Holy Cross punt at Fitton Field, and later died. Belyea suffered a fractured sixth vertebra after being tackled by Holy Cross' captain, Metivier. Belyea was taken to Saint Vincent Hospital in Worcester, where he died the following day.

Holy Cross played its home games at Fitton Field on the college campus in Worcester, Massachusetts.

Schedule

References

Holy Cross
Holy Cross Crusaders football seasons
Holy Cross football